Sathanur may refer to several places in India:

Andhra Pradesh
Sathanur, Andhra Pradesh, a village in Kosigi Taluk, Kurnool district

Karnataka
Sathanur, Kanakapura, Karnataka, Ramanagara district
Sathanur (Vidhan Sabha constituency), Legislative Assembly constituency of Karnataka, India
Sathanur, Magadi, Karnataka, a village in Ramanagara district
Sathanur, Bangalore, Karnataka, a village
Sathanur, Mandya, Karnataka, Mandya district
Sathanurapalli, a village in Srinivaspur Taluk, Kolar district

Tamil Nadu
Sathanur, Perambalur, Tamil Nadu, a village in Kunnam Taluk, Perambalur district
National Fossil Wood Park, Sathanur, Perambalur, Tamil Nadu
Sathanur, Thandrampet, Tamil Nadu, a village in Thandrampet Taluk, Tiruvannamalai district
Sathanur Dam, Tamil Nadu, India
Sathanoor, Vandavasi, Tamil Nadu, a village in Vandavasi Taluk, Tiruvannamalai district
Sathanur, Tirukkoyilur, Tamil Nadu, a village in Tirukkoyilur Taluk, Viluppuram district
Sathanur, Kallakkurichi, Tamil Nadu, a village in Kallakkurichi Taluk, Viluppuram district
Sathanur, Thiruvarur, Tamil Nadu, a village in Needamangalam Taluk, Thiruvarur district
Sathanur, Thiruvidaimarudur Central, Tamil Nadu, a village in Thiruvidaimarudur Taluk, Thanjavur district (2011 Census Village code: 638442)
Sathanur, Thiruvidaimarudur South, Tamil Nadu, a village in Thiruvidaimarudur Taluk, Thanjavur district (2011 Census Village code: 638467)
Sathanur, Needamangalam, Tamil Nadu, a village in Needamangalam Taluk, Thanjavur district
Sathanur, Thiruvaiyaru, Tamil Nadu, a village in Thiruvaiyaru Taluk, Thanjavur district
Sathanur, Sivaganga, Tamil Nadu, a village in Ponnamaravathi Taluk, Sivaganga district
Sathanur, Ramanathapuram, Tamil Nadu, a village in Mudukulathur Taluk, Ramanathapuram district
Sathanur, Krishnagiri, Tamil Nadu, a village in Denkanikottai Taluk, Krishnagiri district
Sathanur, Tindivanam, Tamil Nadu, a village in Tindivanam Taluk, Olakkur Union, Villupuram District

See also
Sattanur (disambiguation)